NGC 2803, also known as PCG 26181, is an elliptical or lenticular galaxy in the zodiac constellation Cancer. It was discovered March 21, 1784, by William Herschel. It is interacting with NGC 2802.

References

External links 
 

Barred lenticular galaxies
2803
Cancer (constellation)
026181
Interacting galaxies